Jordan Taylor Hanson (born March 14, 1983) is an American musician best known as a member of the pop rock band Hanson. He was born in Jenks, Oklahoma, a suburb of Tulsa. He sings both lead and back-up vocals, and plays keyboard, percussion (including drums, bongos and the tambourine), guitar, harmonica, and piano. Taylor was the lead singer of supergroup Tinted Windows.

Early life
Hanson was born in a suburb of Tulsa, Oklahoma, the second of seven children born to Clarke Walker Hanson and Diana Frances Hanson. He has partial Danish ancestry.

Music career
Hanson sings and plays keyboard and the piano with the band Hanson. He and his older brother, Isaac, started the band with younger brother Zac in 1992, and were initially known as The Hanson Brothers (later changed to just 'Hanson'). At the time, Isaac was eleven, Taylor was nine, and Zac was six. They performed as an a cappella group outside clubs in Tulsa. On May 6, 1997, the band released their first major studio album, Middle of Nowhere, with Mercury Records. The first single, "MMMBop", made it to number one on the Billboard Hot 100 chart.

May 6 has been declared "Hanson Day" in Tulsa in honor of the release of Middle of Nowhere. Each year on this day the band hosts concerts and celebrations in Tulsa, and fans travel from around the world to attend.

In 2003, Taylor Hanson co-founded 3CG Records along with brothers Isaac and Zac Hanson.

It was announced in early 2009 that Taylor Hanson, along with former Smashing Pumpkins guitarist James Iha, Cheap Trick drummer Bun E. Carlos and Fountains of Wayne bassist Adam Schlesinger, formed a new band called Tinted Windows. The band played their first publicized gig at SXSW in Austin, Texas on March 20, 2009. Their first album was released on April 21, 2009. Adam Schlesinger died in 2020 from COVID-19. A few months after Schlesinger's death, Hanson mentioned that a Tinted Windows reunion had been in the works.

Personal life

On June 8, 2002, Hanson married Natalie Anne Bryant, whom he met in 2000. They have seven children; sons born in 2002, 2006, 2008, and 2018 and daughters born in 2005, 2012, and 2020.

In 2014, Taylor Hanson founded Food on the Move, a Tulsa based volunteer organization that acts to end food insecurity in the community. Food On The Move offers fresh produce, prepared meals, and access to community and health resources.

In 2021, as part of The Sound of Black Wall Street musical project, Taylor Hanson contributed to an album paying homage to the hundredth anniversary of the Tulsa race massacre. His song, "Sound Like Joy", was recorded in historic Vernon AME Church at the heart of Tulsa's Black Wall Street.

References

External links

 
 Tinted Windows Official Web Site
 

1983 births
American child singers
American multi-instrumentalists
American male pop singers
American pop rock singers
American male singer-songwriters
American rock songwriters
Living people
Musicians from Tulsa, Oklahoma
Tambourine players
Singer-songwriters from Oklahoma
21st-century American singers
21st-century drummers
21st-century American male singers
Tinted Windows (band) members
20th-century American keyboardists
Hanson (band)
Child pop musicians
Child rock musicians
American people of Danish descent